Tristram Dick Wyatt (16 December 1956) is a British evolutionary biologist and author. He is a senior research fellow in the Department of Zoology, University of Oxford and an emeritus fellow of Kellogg College, Oxford. Wyatt researches pheromones and animal behavior.

Education
Wyatt completed a PhD in animal behaviour at University of Cambridge. His 1983 dissertation was titled The ecology of parental care in the saltmarsh beetle Bledius spectabilis.

Academic career
Wyatt was a lecturer at University of Leeds and conducted research fellowships at University of California, Berkeley and Cardiff University. He joined the Oxford University Department for Continuing Education in 1989 as a university lecturer of biological sciences. From 2000 to 2005, Wyatt was University of Oxford's director of distance and online learning. In 2015, he gave a TEDx talk titled Smelly Mystery of Human Pheromones. Wyatt is a senior research fellow in the Department of Zoology, University of Oxford and an emeritus fellow of Kellogg College, Oxford. He is a visiting lecturer at University College London.

Wyatt researches the evolution of pheromones and animal behaviour.

Personal life
Wyatt is gay and married to a photographer and artist. He founded the Oxford Area Academic LGBT Staff Network. In 2009, Wyatt co-founded University of Oxford's official LGBT+ Staff Network which started the annual Oxford University LGBT history-month lecture. In 2013, he supported the LGBT Staff Network i600 at Imperial College London. Wyatt has spoken at the UK LGBT STEMinar, Oxford Pride, and the Royal Society during Pride in London.

Awards and honours
In 2014, Wyatt's book, Pheromones and Animal Behaviour, won the Royal Society of Biology's best postgraduate textbook prize.

Selected works

Books

References

External links
 
 

Living people
1956 births
Place of birth missing (living people)
British evolutionary biologists
20th-century British biologists
21st-century British biologists
21st-century British male writers
21st-century British non-fiction writers
Alumni of the University of Cambridge
Academics of the University of Leeds
Fellows of Kellogg College, Oxford
British LGBT scientists
Gay academics
British gay writers